Handrij Zejler (1 February 1804 – 15 October 1872; official German name Andreas Seiler) was a Sorbian writer, Lutheran pastor, and national activist. He co-founded the Lusatian cultural and scientific society Maćica Serbska.

Zejler was born on 1 February 1804 in Słona Boršć (German: Salzenforst), now a part of Budyšin (Bautzen). He was an author of popular religious, love and patriotic poems, as well as the Sorbian national anthem Rjana Łužica, linguistic works, publicist works, ballads, satires, fables. He died on 15 October 1872 in Łaz (Lohsa) near Wojerecy (Hoyerswerda).

Zejler is seen today as one of the founders of Sorbian national literature.

Memory 
His name bears the State Prize of the Ministry of Science and Art of the Federal State of Saxony.

See also
Jakub Bart-Ćišinski (1856–1909) - Poet, writer, playwright, and translator
Jan Kilian (1811–1884) - Pastor and leader of the Sorbian colony in Texas
Korla Awgust Kocor (1822–1904) - Composer and conductor
Ludwig Leichhardt (1813–1848) - Explorer and naturalist
Jan Arnošt Smoler (1816–1884) - Philologist and writer
Jurij Brězan (1916–2006) - Writer, novelist, and author of children's books
Jurij Koch (b. 1936) - Writer, editor, and reporter
John Symank (1935–2002) - Head coach for Northern Arizona University and the University of Texas at Arlington football teams, defensive back in the NFL, and player for the University of Florida 
Mato Kosyk (1853–1940) - Poet and minister
Kito Lorenc (1938–2017) - Writer, lyric poet, and translator
Erwin Strittmatter (1912–1994)
Stanislaw Tillich (b. 1959)
Mina Witkojc (1893–1975)

References

 
 
Handrij Zejler, Pfarrer, Publizist, Patriot - Begründer der modernen sorbischen Dichtkunst

1804 births
1872 deaths
People from Bautzen
People from the Electorate of Saxony
German activists
Sorbian-language writers
Writers from Saxony